Nu'u Fa'aola (born January 15, 1964) is a former running back of Samoan ancestry who played in the National Football League from 1986 to 1989.  He played for the New York Jets and Miami Dolphins primarily on special teams after playing collegiately at the University of Hawaiʻi at Mānoa. Fa'aola attended Farrington High School in Honolulu, Hawai'i.

In media
During his playing days he dated future Miss America Carolyn Sapp, starred in a 1991 autobiographical television movie, Miss America: Behind the Crown which depicted her as the victim of physical abuse at Faaola's hands.  Records indicate she filed a police report against him and obtained a restraining order in October 1990 (Good Housekeeping magazine, Sept. 1992.)

External links
Stats from NFL.com

1964 births
Living people
American sportspeople of Samoan descent
American football running backs
Hawaii Rainbow Warriors football players
New York Jets players
Miami Dolphins players
Players of American football from Honolulu